Albania competed at the 2009 Mediterranean Games in Pescara, Italy.

Boxing

Men

Rowing 
Men

Weightlifting

Men

Women

Wrestling

Men
Greco-Roman

Freestyle

Number of Entries by Sport

See also
 Mediterranean Games
 2009 Mediterranean Games medal table
 European Olympic Committees

References

Nations at the 2009 Mediterranean Games
2009
Mediterranean Games